Shah Muhammad Sagir was one of the earliest Bengali Muslim poets, if not the first.

Life
Shah Muhammad Sagir was a poet of the 14/15th century, during the reign of the Sultan of Bengal Ghiyasuddin Azam Shah. He was born to a Fakir family in Chittagong, the then cultural capital of Arakan.

His best known work is Yusuf-Zulekha, which has commendatory verses for Ghiyasuddin Azam Shah. He was the court poet of Azam Shah and wrote the volume at his request. Although it has praise for the parents and teachers of the poet, it does not mention their names or residence. Shah Muhammad Sagir is considered to be the first writer to introduce Perso-Arabic vocabulary into Bengali poetry.

His works
Yusuf-Zulekha

References

Bengali male poets
Year of death unknown
Year of birth unknown
Bengal Sultanate officers
15th-century Bengali poets
15th-century Indian Muslims